Malout is a town, just outside of Muktsar Sahib city in the Muktsar district of the Indian state of Punjab. It is in the southern Punjab "cotton belt", where production per kilometer is one of the highest in India. Malout is on NH-354 and NH-9 and NH-7, which connects Fazilka to New Delhi.

History
Bhatti Rajputs founded a fort Malout here. Before Partition 1947 , It Is Village Of Muslim Bhatti Rajputs.
The Britishers set up a base there to import and export glucose which Indians call normally mal to Karachi. At that time this city was very famous as Mal out centre. 

Malout was founded 400–500 years ago, and the origin of its name is uncertain. In 1917, the British government established the Bathinda–Karachi railway line; the Malout railway station was built the following year. The town was incorporated on 19 March 1920. A seven-member committee purchased land, which was divided into shopping and residential areas.

On 17 November 1921, Firozpur district commissioner J. C. Koldsitrimiu established a water-storage and -purification tank system in Malout. Edward, Prince of Wales, visited the region that day and the system was named in his honour.

Malout began growing, and the town had a post office, telephone exchange, guest house and cemetery by the end of 1940. With cotton producers and the agricultural machinery industry, Malout and its nearby villages were known as the cotton capital of Punjab.

Climate
The region's temperature varies widely by season. The western Himalayas in the north and the Thar Desert in the south and southwest primarily determine the climate. The south-western monsoon brings nearly 70 percent of the annual rainfall from July to September. Most of the district has an arid (tropic) moisture regime, according to soil-classification criteria. Soil-moisture computations using the Newhall mathematical model indicate that the region has a "weak aridic" moisture regime (Van Wambeke, 1985).

Political representation
Baljit Kaur, MLA of Malout Assembly Constituency, was elected in 2022.

Commerce and industry
Municipal committee does not own any land or any place but despite than committee asks for annual rent of the shops near by area shops of Municipal committee. Legally committee has no right to ask any rent against any shop.

Notable residents
 Rohit Bansal, chief executive officer and co-founder of Snapdeal
 Kamalpreet Kaur, Indian Athlete

References

Cities and towns in Sri Muktsar Sahib district